The 1985 New South Wales Rugby League premiership was the seventy-eighth season of professional rugby league football in Australia. Thirteen teams competed for the J J Giltinan Shield and Winfield Cup during the season, which culminated in a grand final between the Canterbury-Bankstown and St. George clubs. This season NSWRL teams also competed for the 1985 National Panasonic Cup.

Season summary
Twenty-six regular season rounds were played from March till September, resulting in a top five of St. George, Balmain, Canterbury, Parramatta and Penrith battling it out in the finals

The 1985 season's Rothmans Medallist was Balmain's lock, Wayne Pearce. The Dally M Award was given to Penrith's halfback, Greg Alexander, while Rugby League Week gave its player of the year award to Parramatta's lock, Ray Price.

Teams
The lineup of clubs remained unchanged from the previous year, with thirteen contesting the 1985 premiership, including five Sydney-based foundation teams, another six from Sydney, one from greater New South Wales and one from the Australian Capital Territory

Ladder

Finals

Chart

Grand final

The 1985 grand final was played at the Sydney Cricket Ground before a crowd of 44,569. Canterbury continually put St George fullback Burgess under the test of the high-ball in his in-goal area, which, under the rules of the time, resulted in a line drop-out with the Bulldogs regaining possession. After felling St George's Graeme Wynn as a scrum broke up, Canterbury's prop Peter Kelly was surprising awarded a penalty and shortly thereafter Kelly used the blindside to send winger Peter Mortimer over out wide for a 6-0 half time lead.

Bulldogs half and skipper Steve Mortimer seized control of the match and centre Andrew Farrar clinched it with a field goal in the 72nd minute to take the score to 7-0. A last light of hope appeared for the Dragons when Steve Morris scored and Michael O'Connor converted with five minutes left on the clock. In the end a practised and clinical approach from Canterbury shut out the Dragons who had been the minor premiers.

Canterbury-Bankstown 7Tries: P Mortimer. Goal: Farrar. Field Goal: Farrar.

St. George 6Tries: Morris. Goal: O'Connor.

Man-of-the-match: Steve Mortimer

Player statistics
The following statistics are as of the conclusion of Round 26.

Top 5 point scorers

Top 5 try scorers

Top 5 goal scorers

References

External links
Rugby League Tables - Season 1985 The World of Rugby League
Results:1981-90 at rabbitohs.com.au
1985 J J Giltinan Shield and Winfield Cup at rleague.com
NSWRL season 1985 at rugbyleagueproject.org

New South Wales Rugby League premiership
NSWRL season